The French municipal elections of 2014 were held on 23 March of that year with a second round of voting, where necessary, on 30 March to elect the municipal councils of France's communes. The first task of each newly constituted municipal council is to elect a mayor for that commune.

Municipal councillors, and the mayors they elect, ordinarily serve a term of six years.

Exit polls
An exit poll by pollster BVA showed:

Balance by parties

Left Front 
* Lost cities: Villejuif, Le Blanc-Mesnil, Saint-Ouen, Bobigny, Aubagne, Vaulx-en-Velin, Villepinte, Bagnolet, Viry-Châtillon, Roissy-en-Brie, Limeil-Brévannes, Achères, Hennebont, Fourmies, La Queue-en-Brie, Gisors, Saint-Orens-de-Gameville, Saint-Claude, Aniche, Vieux-Condé, Pierre-Bénite, Varennes-Vauzelles, Portes-lès-Valence, Grigny, Elne, Roussillon, Boucau, Houdain, Feignies, Migennes, Trignac, Divion, Lallaing, Quiévrechain, Coursan, Fenain, Cuges-les-Pins, Auchy-les-Mines, Évin-Malmaison, Vermelles, Drap, Laigneville, Hérin, Garchizy.

* Cities won: Montreuil, Aubervilliers, 1st arrondissement of Lyon, Thiers, Onnaing, Magnanville, Ambazac, Courpière, Rilhac-Rancon, Annay, Escautpont, Serémange-Erzange, Avesnes-les-Aubert.

Socialist Party 
* Lost cities:, Reims, Tours, Pau, Ajaccio, Quimper, 9th arrondissement of Paris, Pessac, Chelles, Belfort, Charleville-Mézières, Chalon-sur-Saône, Anglet, Joué-lès-Tours, Nevers, Conflans-Sainte-Honorine, Schiltigheim, Palaiseau, Athis-Mons, Périgueux, Saint-Médard-en-Jalles, Bergerac, Montbéliard, Les Ulis, Villeparisis, Brétigny-sur-Orge, Dole, Montgeron, Mantes-la-Ville, Montceau-les-Mines, Maurepas, Chilly-Mazarin, Riom, Marmande, Ploemeur, Vendôme, Bruz, Cesson-Sévigné, Juvisy-sur-Orge, Issoire, Pontivy, Bois-d'Arcy, Guipavas, Rixheim, Épinay-sous-Sénart, Guebwiller, Valentigney, Beaumont, Orthez, Oloron-Sainte-Marie, Igny, Cosne-Cours-sur-Loire, Gerzat, Fondettes, Vernouillet, Saint-Germain-lès-Arpajon, Ploërmel, Crosne, Saint-Pierre-du-Mont, Meulan-en-Yvelines, Saint-Pierre-du-Perray, Bellerive-sur-Allier, Lempdes, Ballan-Miré, Coutras, Romagnat, Chinon, Saint-Vincent-de-Tyrosse, Cébazat, Questembert, Artigues-près-Bordeaux, Mordelles, Revin, Carbon-Blanc, Ambert, Les Essarts-le-Roi, Aire-sur-l'Adour, Châteaubourg, Inzinzac-Lochrist, Wissous, Plédran, Pordic, Bethoncourt, Magnanville, Lèves, Genlis, Gan, Montbard, Saint-Astier, Ceyrat, Bar-sur-Aube, Saintry-sur-Seine, Pauillac, Villabé, Bavilliers, Saint-Sever, Vouziers, Hillion, Ribérac, Castelnau-de-Médoc, Boissy-sous-Saint-Yon, Fumay, Romillé, Bavans, Brassac-les-Mines, Plancoët, Mussidan, Ambès, Plombières-lès-Dijon, Le Bugue, Puy-Guillaume, Vendays-Montalivet, Sainte-Foy-la-Grande, Le Buisson-de-Cadouin, Nohanent, Cercy-la-Tour, Corbigny,

Results in largest cities

Aix-en-Provence 
Incumbent mayor: Maryse Joissains-Masini (UMP)

Amiens 
Incumbent mayor: Gilles Demailly (PS)

Angers 
Incumbent mayor: Frédéric Béatse (PS)

Bordeaux 
Incumbent mayor: Alain Juppé (UMP)

Caen 
Incumbent mayor: Philippe Duron (PS)

Grenoble 
Incumbent mayor: Michel Destot (PS)

Le Havre 
Incumbent mayor: Édouard Philippe (UMP)

Lille 
Incumbent mayor: Martine Aubry (PS)

Limoges 
Incumbent mayor: Alain Rodet (PS)

Lyon 
Incumbent mayor: Gérard Collomb (PS)

Marseille 
Incumbent mayor: Jean-Claude Gaudin (UMP)

Nancy 
Incumbent mayor: André Rossinot (UDI)

Paris 

In Paris, Nathalie Kosciusko-Morizet (UMP) with 35,91 percent of the votes and Anne Hidalgo (PS) with 34,40 percent qualified for the second round. Hidalgo won the second round with 54.5 percent of the votes, becoming Paris's first female mayor.

The lists supporting Hidalgo (PS, Communists, Radical Party of the Left, Europe Ecology – The Greens) got 91 seats, the lists supporting Kosciusko-Morizet (UMP, UDI and MoDem) received 71, while the Left Party  received 1.

Perpignan 
Incumbent mayor: Jean-Marc Pujol (UMP)

Reims 
Incumbent mayor: Adeline Hazan (PS)

Toulon 
Incumbent mayor: Hubert Falco (UMP)

Toulouse 
Incumbent mayor: Pierre Cohen (PS)

Villeurbanne 
Incumbent mayor: Jean-Paul Bret (PS)

Results in symbolic cities

Hénin-Beaumont 
Incumbent mayor: Eugène Binaisse (PS)

Pau 
Incumbent mayor: Martine Lignières-Cassou (PS)

References

2014
2014 elections in France